Anju Tamang (born 22 December 1995) is an Indian women's international footballer who plays as a forward for Odisha FC and the India women's national team. She joined Gokulam Kerala for 2018–19 Indian Women's League.

Early life
Anju Tamang was born on 22 December 1995 to Ram Singh Tamang and Kanchi Maya in Birpara in the district of Alipurduar, West Bengal. She is of Sikkimese descent and comes from a family of farmers. She went for schooling at Alagarah High School, Kalimpong and the Scottish Universities’ Mission Institution (SUMI), Kalimpong. She went on for the higher studies at the University of North Bengal, Siliguri.

Career

Tamang played football with boys while growing up and did not encounter a professional coach until she was 17. At the age of 19, she progressed to an academy and played in the inaugural Indian Women's League.

International goals

Honours
India
 SAFF Women's Championship: 2019
 South Asian Games Gold medal: 2019

Rising Students Club
 Indian Women's League: 2017–18

KRYPHSA
Indian Women's League runner-up: 2019–20

See also
 Indian Gorkha

References

External links 
 Anju Tamang at All India Football Federation
 

1995 births
Living people
People from Alipurduar district
Footballers from West Bengal
Sportswomen from West Bengal
Indian women's footballers
Women's association football forwards
Kryphsa F.C. Players
Gokulam Kerala FC Women players
Sethu FC players
Odisha FC Women players
Indian Women's League players
India women's international footballers
South Asian Games gold medalists for India
South Asian Games medalists in football
Indian Gorkhas
University of North Bengal alumni